"Lose Your Mind" is BoA's 24th Japanese single. Alongside the title track is one B-side, "Smile Again". Lose Your Mind was released on December 12, 2007.

Music video
The music video features BoA as a supermodel on the catwalk. She and two other female backup dancers start dancing on the catwalk and are joined by three male dancers. The music video also shows BoA in a short black wig. Yutaka Furukawa from Doping Panda also makes an appearance in the music video, playing the electric guitar. BoA's three outfits in the music video are a huge contrast to each other. She and her backup dancers are featured wearing black clothes. Later in the music video they are all wearing more casual clothes.

Track listing

CD
 Lose Your Mind (featuring Yutaka Furukawa from Doping Panda)
 Smile Again
 Lose Your Mind (featuring Yutaka Furukawa from Doping Panda) (Instrumental)
 Smile Again (Instrumental)

DVD
 Lose Your Mind (featuring Yutaka Furukawa from Doping Panda) (Music Clip)

Live performances
2007.11.24 - Music Fair 21
2007.12.07 - Music Station
2007.12.15 - Music Japan
2007.12.16 - CDTV

Charts

Oricon Sales Chart (Japan)

2007 singles
2007 songs
BoA songs
Avex Trax singles
Songs written by Jonas Jeberg
Songs written by Greg Lawson
Songs written by Damon Sharpe